Coleophora tesquorum is a moth of the family Coleophoridae. It is found in Jezkazgan, Kazakhstan.

References

tesquorum
Moths of Asia
Moths described in 1976